Desejos de Mulher is a Brazilian telenovela that was produced and aired by TV Globo from January 21, 2002, to August 24, 2002, totaling 185 chapters, replacing As Filhas da Mãe and replaced by O Beijo do Vampiro.

It stars Regina Duarte, Glória Pires, Eduardo Moscovis, Herson Capri, Alessandra Negrini and José de Abreu as the main characters of the plot. Freely based on the book Fashionably Late from Olivia Goldsmith.

Plot 

On the night of another award in his brilliant career, the stylist Andréa Vargas discovers, through his sister, Júlia Moreno, who is not legitimate daughter of Attilio and Mercedes. Andréa and Júlia live at loggerheads since adolescence when Júlia was responsible for separating sister of his first love, Diogo Valente. The boy disappeared in life, misunderstood by Andréa, and many years later is back, ready to regain his love.

Now, Andréa is a professional famous in the fashion world, married to Bruno, who runs his business. Despite the large thud to have spent my whole life without knowing his real mother, Andréa hardly expect the worst is yet to come Bruno has an affair with Selma Dumont, his right arm in the studio, and the two plan to get hold of all your assets and brand "Ándrea Vargas". In reality most interested in the demoralization of Selma Andréa is that besides the husband and money, plans to steal everything that Andrea has, including his name. Jealousy and envy sick of Selma has a reason: it's your sister, daughter of Isaura, a mother who never met Andréa.

While the dramas of Andrea accumulate, Júlia lives a quiet life in his turnaround. Her husband, Renato, is unjustly imprisoned. In the struggle to clear him, and his entire family, is the reporter Chico Maia, Renato stuck with this mess, and with whom Julia gets involved.

There is still the core of Ariel, a gay journalist who lives a comical relationship with Thaddeus. Ariel still leads a house where the last thing that happens is quiet: Paty's daughter, her friend Bárbara and her godson Nicolau. The life of Ariel still suffers a reversal when he turns the target's passion Virgínia who does everything to win it and eventually go live in the mansion, taking in tow the clever Bill.

Cast

References

External links
 
 Página oficial de Desejos de Mulher na Rede Globo.

2002 Brazilian television series debuts
2002 Brazilian television series endings
2002 telenovelas
TV Globo telenovelas
Brazilian telenovelas
Portuguese-language telenovelas